"Never Go Back" is a song by Israeli singer-songwriter Dennis Lloyd. Written and produced by Lloyd, it was released by Arista Records on 15 February 2019 as the lead single from his debut extended play, Exident (2019). The song's lyrics are a continuation of the narrative of his 2016 single "Nevermind". Lloyd said, "I recorded 'Nevermind' at the beginning of my relationship, and I wrote 'Never Go Back' two days after we broke up."

Track listing

Charts

Weekly charts

Year-end charts

Certifications

References

2019 singles
2019 songs
Dennis Lloyd songs
Arista Records singles
English-language Israeli songs
Number-one singles in Israel
Song recordings produced by Dennis Lloyd
Songs written by Dennis Lloyd